WRBD-LP Channel 8 was a low-powered independent television station licensed to Pensacola, Florida.

The station carried selected programming from CTN & Youtoo TV and reached as many as 48,000 households in the Pensacola area.  It also ran religious programs, sports, and other entertainment programs.

References

External links

RBD-LP
Television channels and stations established in 2001
2001 establishments in Florida
Defunct television stations in the United States
RBD-LP